Slobozia is the capital city of Ialomița County, Muntenia, Romania, with a population of 48,241 in 2011.

Etymology

Its name is from the Romanian "slobozie", which meant a recently colonized village which was free of taxation. The word itself comes from the Slavic word "slobod" which means "free". As it is located in the middle of flat land (Bărăgan Plain), it was very vulnerable to Tatar and Ottoman incursions. To encourage peasants to settle there, they were exempted from some taxes, hence the name.

Geography
The city is within  of the Bucharest-Constanța A2 Motorway (Autostrada Soarelui).

In the present administrative form, Slobozia consists of Slobozia proper and the neighbourhoods of Bora and Slobozia Nouă.

Economy
The main activity in the area is agriculture, processing of the agricultural products and light industry.

Culture

In 1990 the Cultural Centre was inaugurated, bearing the name of the conductor and composer Ionel Perlea, a city native. The building houses exhibition and performance rooms, bookstores, cultural institutions. In 1999 the Cultural Centre Ionel Perlea entered the UNESCO circuit.

The city is the headquarters of the Romanian Orthodox Diocese of Slobozia and Călărași, established in 1993.

Demographics
At the 2002 census, 97.6% of inhabitants were ethnic Romanians and 2.2% Roma. 98.6% were Romanian Orthodox, 0.4% Seventh-day Adventist and 0.2% Roman Catholic.

Tourism
Amara Resort is also a balneoclimateric resort. Access to Amara is by minibuses that leave every 15 minutes from the Slobozia Train Station.

Twin towns – sister cities

Slobozia is twinned with:
 Nanyang, China
 Razgrad, Bulgaria
 Silistra, Bulgaria
 Veles, North Macedonia

Notable people 
Mircea Dinescu, journalist and political satirist
Petru Filip, politician
Adrian Mihalcea, footballer
Minelli, singer, songwriter and lyricist

References

External links

 

 
Populated places in Ialomița County
Localities in Muntenia
Cities in Romania
Capitals of Romanian counties
Place names of Slavic origin in Romania